The filmography of British actor and comedian David Walliams.

Filmography

Film

Television

Guest appearances
Top of the Pops (7 April 1994) - Audience member
Friday Night with Jonathan Ross (1 November 2002, 5 December 2003, 3 December 2004, 7 December 2007, 26 September 2008) - Guest
Richard & Judy (15 December 2003, 6 December 2004, 8 December 2005, 27 June 2006, 5 July 2006, 7 October 2008) - Guest 
Breakfast (11 October 2004, 18 February 2008, 4 February 2010, 1 March 2010, 19 February 2011, 1 June 2011, 2 September 2011) - Guest
This Morning (16 December 2004, 10 November 2006, 16 March 2007, 21 May 2007, 13 July 2007, 19 October 2012, 2 September 2013) - Guest
8 Out of 10 Cats (10 June 2005, 2 June 2006, 23 June 2006, 22 June 2007, 20 July 2007, 13 June 2008, 12 June 2009, 3 July 2009, 5 February 2010, 19 February 2010, 5 March 2011) - Team captain
Parkinson (15 October 2005, 16 September 2006) - Guest
Top Gear (27 December 2005) - Guest
Rob Brydon's Annually Retentive (18 July 2006) - Guest
The Paul O'Grady Show (13 October 2006, 20 December 2007, 5 November 2009) - Guest
Dawn French's Boys Who Do Comedy (2007) - Guest
Loose Women (19 December 2008, 14 November 2012) - Guest
The Graham Norton Show (26 March 2009, 24 December 2010, 15 November 2014, 6 March 2015, 20 November 2015, 27 May 2017, 2 November 2018, 17 May 2019) - Guest
Chris Moyles' Quiz Night - (29 March 2009, 26 February 2010, 26 August 2011, 23 October 2011) - Guest
Alan Carr: Chatty Man (5 July 2009, 22 December 2009, 1 August 2010, 6 November 2011, 25 December 2011, 4 May 2012, 30 November 2012, 25 December 2012, 6 September 2013, 11 April 2014) - Guest
The One Show (5 March 2010, 16 December 2010, 1 September 2011, 5 September 2011, 9 December 2011, 21 September 2012, 18 December 2017, 13 June 2018, 14 December 2018) - Guest
Who Wants to Be a Millionaire?: Mother's Day Special (2011) - Contestant, with mother Kathleen
The Wright Stuff (8 September 2011, 13 September 2011) - Guest
The Jonathan Ross Show (15 October 2011, 24 March 2012, 13 October 2012, 20 December 2014, 19 December 2015, 10 December 2016, 4 November 2017, 8 December 2018) - Guest
Strictly Come Dancing (5 November 2011, 8 December 2012, 9 December 2012) - Audience member
A League of Their Own (11 November 2011, 18 May 2012, 2 November 2012, 6 September, 4 October 2013, 10 October 2014, 7 January 2016, 6 October 2016, 13 September 2018) - Panellist
Ant & Dec's Saturday Night Takeaway (23 February 2013) - Celebrity guest announcer
Catchphrase: Mother's Day Special (30 March 2014) - Contestant, with mother Kathleen 
The Guess List (3 May 2014) - Guest
The Late Late Show with James Corden (7 March 2016) - Guest
8 Out of 10 Cats Does Countdown (24 September 2016, 8 October 2016) - Team captain
Good Morning Britain (21 December 2017, 28 March 2018, 18 April 2018) - Guest
Lorraine (4 April 2019) - Guest

References

External links
 

Filmography
British filmographies
Male actor filmographies